Squash is one of the sports at the quadrennial Commonwealth Games competition. It has been a Commonwealth Games sport since 1998. It is a core sport and must be included in the sporting programme of each edition of the Games.

Editions

Past winners

Individual competition

All-time medal table
Updated after the 2022 Commonwealth Games

External links
Commonwealth Games sport index

 
Sports at the Commonwealth Games
Commonwealth Games